Cicuta maculata is a highly poisonous species of flowering plant in the carrot family known by several common names, including spotted water hemlock, spotted parsley, spotted cowbane, and the suicide root by the Iroquois. It is native to nearly all of North America, from northern Canada to southern Mexico.

Description
The long leaves are made up of several lance-shaped, pointed, serrated leaflets. The inflorescence of white flowers is similar in appearance to other species in the carrot family. It is a compound umbel with many clusters of flowers. The dry tan-brown fruit is a few millimeters long.

The plant prefers wet habitats, such as wet meadows, roadside ditches, pond margins, open marshes, and freshwater swamps. Flowering is from May to September.

The poisonous plant is occasionally mistaken for parsnips, due to its clusters of white tuberous roots.

Toxicity

The confusion with parsnips can be fatal as C. maculata is extremely poisonous. It is considered to be North America's most toxic plant. 

Cicuta is fatal when swallowed, causing violent and painful convulsions. Though a number of people have died from water hemlock poisoning over the centuries, livestock have long been the worst affected (hence the name "cowbane"), with ingestion of the plant causing death in as little as 15 minutes.

The chief poison is cicutoxin, an unsaturated aliphatic alcohol that is most concentrated in the roots. Upon human consumption, nausea, vomiting, and tremors occur within 30–60 minutes, followed by severe cramps, projectile vomiting, and convulsions. Occasional long-term effects include retrograde amnesia. Ingestion of water hemlock in any quantity can result in death or permanent damage to the central nervous system.

See also
Conium maculatum

References

External links

 Jepson Manual Treatment
 Photo gallery
 
 
 

Apioideae
Flora of North America
Plants described in 1753
Taxa named by Carl Linnaeus
Poisonous plants